Daniel 'Dani' López Menéndez (born 7 October 1983) is a Spanish former footballer who played as a left back, and is the sporting director of UP Langreo.

Playing career
Born in Oviedo, Asturias, López appeared in 150 Segunda División matches over five seasons. He represented in the competition UD Salamanca (two years), UD Las Palmas (two) and CD Numancia.

López retired in 2019 at the age of 35, after spending the later part of his career in the lower leagues and in his native region. He also played one year in the Greek Football League, with Iraklis Thessaloniki FC.

Post-retirement
After retiring, López became his last club UP Langreo's director of football.

Personal life
López's older brother, José Alberto, was involved in the sport as a manager, and spent most of his career with Sporting de Gijón.

References

External links

1983 births
Living people
Footballers from Oviedo
Spanish footballers
Association football defenders
Segunda División players
Segunda División B players
Tercera División players
Real Oviedo Vetusta players
Real Avilés CF footballers
Marino de Luanco footballers
UD Salamanca players
UD Las Palmas players
CD Numancia players
Deportivo Alavés players
UP Langreo footballers
Football League (Greece) players
Iraklis Thessaloniki F.C. players
Spanish expatriate footballers
Expatriate footballers in Greece
Spanish expatriate sportspeople in Greece